Leif Olve Dolonen Larsen (born April 3, 1975) is a Norwegian athlete who has competed in shot put, American football and professional boxing.

Shot put
In shot putting, Larsen finished thirteenth at the 1992 World Junior Championships and fourth at the 1994 World Junior Championships. His last international athletics competition was the 1997 European under-23 Championships, where he finished eighth. His personal best throw was 18.76 metres, achieved in April 1997 in Baton Rouge.

American football
Larsen played college football for UTEP Miners and was drafted194th overall by the Buffalo Bills in the 2000 NFL Draft, therefore being one of the 198 players drafted before Tom Brady. Larsen appeared with the Bills in the 2000 and 2001 seasons. At the 2000 NFL Combine, Larsen bench pressed  45 times, one of the best marks of all time.

Boxing
Larsen retired from football to pursue a boxing career. Since his first fight in 2003, he has won nine out of nine matches, eight of these by knockout.

He defeated British heavyweight boxer Danny Williams in Pabellon Municipal, Silla, Valencia, Comunidad Valenciana, Spain on 2 December 2011.

References

Sources
Profile at DatabaseFootball
 

1975 births
Living people
Sportspeople from Oslo
Norwegian male shot putters
Norwegian players of American football
American football defensive tackles
UTEP Miners football players
UTEP Miners men's track and field athletes
Buffalo Bills players
Norwegian male boxers
Heavyweight boxers
Track and field athletes in the National Football League
Norwegian expatriate sportspeople in the United States